UIC College of Pharmacy at the University of Illinois Chicago is one of the oldest pharmacy schools in the US, and oldest unit of the University of Illinois system.

History 
Established in 1859, the UIC College of Pharmacy stands as the oldest academic unit of the University of Illinois.

At the sixth annual meeting of the American Pharmacists Association, four Chicago druggists were elected to membership in the society. Upon returning to Chicago, two of those men, Edwin Gale and James D. Paine, began a movement for a formal school of pharmacy. Along with S.S. Bliss, J.H. Read, E.H. Sargent and F. Scammon, all prominent druggists, collaborated to form an organization that would become the College's foundation. Incidentally, the group also served as the first organized society of druggists in the state.

Shortly thereafter, a formal movement towards establishing a school of pharmacy was begun, and the Chicago College of Pharmacy was born. On September 12, 1859, the charter signed by the original founders of the institution was notarized, officially establishing Illinois' first school of pharmacy and the sixth school of pharmacy in the nation. Scammon was elected chairman and Sargent was appointed to the College's board of trustees. Its first complete course was delivered in the winter of 1859, and 1861 marked its first graduating class of two students.

On Sunday, October 8, 1871, at 9:40pm., a fire alarm was sounded in a Chicago pharmacy, the alert of the Great Chicago Fire. Lasting two days, the fire's wrath ravaged 34 city blocks and destroyed nearly 20,000 buildings, including the Chicago College of Pharmacy. Corresponding College Secretary and alumnus Albert Ebert began rallying support from colleagues around the world to help rebuild the College and restock its bookshelves and laboratories. Its reopening heralded a class of 37 students in the fall semester of 1872.

The years that followed were crucial for both the College and the pharmacy profession. Concerns surrounding the safety and ethics of pharmacy practice emerged. Nationwide efforts sprang forth to develop laws regulating the profession. By 1880, the College had been instrumental in forming the Illinois Pharmaceutical Association (now known as the Illinois Pharmacists Association). A year later, the Pharmacy Law of 1881 was passed, mandating education requirements for the practice of pharmacy in Illinois and assigning supervision of the professional to state agencies. Candidates were required to pass an examination given by the State Board of Health. The law also required pharmacists to pay a $2 annual licensing fee.

In 1895, the state legislature amended the original charter for the University of Illinois, allowing the location of professional departments of law, medicine, dentistry, and pharmacy outside of Champaign County. On December 10, 1895, the proposal to acquire the Chicago College of Pharmacy came before the university's board of trustees. On May 1, 1896, the College formally united with the University of Illinois, creating the University of Illinois School of Pharmacy.

Reputation 

The UIC College of Pharmacy is a unit of the University of Illinois. U.S. News & World Report ranks UIC as the seventh best among colleges of pharmacy in the United States.

As of FY2020, the College of Pharmacy ranked in the top ten overecipients of rall federal funding for research, e.g., National Institutes of Health, of 122 U.S. colleges of pharmacy. College of Pharmacy-sponsored research programs reached $30 million in fiscal year 2010 (funding doubled in 5 years).

Admissions 
Although not required, nearly 70 percent of applicants to the PharmD program hold a bachelor's degree prior to admission. To earn the PharmD, students complete a minimum of six years of study: The first two years of prepharmacy coursework can be accomplished at any accredited college or university; the final four years of professional education are completed at the UIC College of Pharmacy. High school students may seek admission to the College of Pharmacy through UIC's Guaranteed Professional Program Admissions initiative; these students are required to complete their prepharmacy coursework at UIC before entry into the College of Pharmacy.

Each graduate (MS/PhD) program has its own admissions requirements and handles its own admissions process. Applicants must apply for admission to a specific program.
Many graduate programs only admit candidates in the fall semester of each year.

The college offers a PharmD/PhD program, in which the professional doctor of pharmacy degree can be earned simultaneously with any of the PhDs offered. Through judicious selection and timing of courses, both degrees can be completed in less overall time than would be required to complete the programs separately.
Some graduate programs allow applications to the master of science degree, usually from students who intend of continuing to the PhD. The dDpartment of bBopharmaceutical sSiences does not admit tstudents o the MS.

Research 
In the National Institutes of Health's (NIH) fiscal year 2016, the college's total reportable research funding was $18.5 million. This places the college in 5th place nationwide for overall research dollars. For the following fiscal year, the college reported $21.15M in awards to the American Association of Colleges of Pharmacy.

Departments 

More than 280 research and clinical faculty conduct research and provide training to more than 160 graduate students and postdoctoral trainees, as well as 700 professional students. Departments in the College of Pharmacy are organized around four major areas of the pharmaceutical sciences: 
 Pharmacy Practice
 Pharmaceutical Sciences
 Pharmacy Systems, Outcomes and Policy

Centers and Institutes 
In addition to its major departmental divisions, the college is home to several specialized research centers and institutes:

 Center for Biomolecular Sciences
 Center for Pharmacoepidemiology and Pharmacoeconomic Research
 Institute for Tuberculosis Research
 UICentre -University of Illinois Center for Engaging Novel Therapeutic Research Entities

Urban Pipeline Program 
Through its investigation of the issue of low representation of underrepresented minority students in pharmacy school, the College concluded that this disparity was due to a lack of exposure among minority elementary and high schoolers to the profession. To address these issues, the College and the Chicago Public Schools Department of College and Career Preparation partnered with industry leaders to offer a comprehensive pharmacy program for high schoolers with the goal of cultivating the next generation of URM pharmacists.

The Urban Pipeline Program is an eight-week, comprehensive, academic, experiential, mentoring and professional- and social-development summer enrichment program. Guiding the program is the "Theoretical and Conceptual Framework Model for Success" that was developed by drawing from the literature on higher education student success and further informed by the Educational Policy Institute's Pathways to College Network Framework.

Notable alumni 
Arthur A. Telcser, pharmacist and Speaker of the Illinois House of Representatives
Abdul Qaiyum, owner of Merz Apothecary

Student organizations 
 Academy of Managed Care Pharmacy
 American Pharmacists Association Academy of Student Pharmacists
 American Society of Consulting Pharmacists
 Asian Pharmacists Association
 Association of Indian Pharmacists in America
 Christian Pharmacists Fellowship International
 Community Drug Education Committee
 Illinois Council of Health System Pharmacists
 Industry Pharmacists Organization
 Muslim Pharmacy Students Association
 Medical Science Liaison Society
 Pharmacy Student Council
 Student National Pharmaceutical Association

Fraternities 
 Kappa Psi
 Phi Delta Chi
 Phi Lambda Sigma National Leadership Society
 Rho Chi Honor society
 Rho Pi Phi International Pharmaceutical Fraternity

References

External links 
 UIC College of Pharmacy

University of Illinois Chicago
Pharmacy schools in Illinois